Livarot is a former commune in the Calvados department in the Normandy region in northwestern France. On 1 January 2016, it was merged into the new commune of Livarot-Pays-d'Auge.

The population is composed of 2,052 inhabitants (in 2017) and the name of its inhabitants is Livarotais.

The town is home to many companies of renown such as the Georges Leroy factory, Graindorge cheese manufacturing which produces Livarot, among others. The commune gave its name to its cheese; Livarot cheese. The La Fermière (CCLF) calvados cider is also produced in the commune.

Geography
Livarot is situated at the junction of the D4 and D579 roads.

Toponymy
The place is attested late in the form Livarrot in 1155, and Livar(r)ou in 1156 or 1157.

The etymological explanation of this place name has no unanimity among toponymists:

Albert Dauzat and Charles Rostaing, based on a false attestation of Livaron from 1137 (form and date wrong), described it as "obscure", while evoking a derivision of ivos, an assumed Gallic word designating if, and declaring it unlikely. They perhaps resume in these previous assumptions. In reality, the term *ivos or *īvos is not attested and should include an asterisk.
Ernest Nègre, reasoning from this same erroneous form, considered that it might be from the Germanic name Liubwar, which is followed by the suffix -o /-onem and that the final would be modified by attraction of names in -ot. However, François de Beaurepaire notes that a Germanic name is never used with this suffix. 
Dominique Fournier refuted Livaron (cacography attributed to Albert Dauzat, and badly dated) and based it on the actual form Livar(r)ou, stemming from the Chronicle of Robert of Torigni, to advance the hypothesis of a Gallo-Roman person named Libarius followed by the suffix of Gallic origin -avo which explains most of the words ending in -ou of Normandy.

History

Battle of Normandy
On 17 July 1944, the pharmacist and Mayor of Livarot brought first aid to Rommel following the strafing of his car by an Allied aircraft, not far away, between the villages of Sainte-Foy-de-Montgommery and Vimoutiers. He was then evacuated, the same day, to the German military hospital in Bernay.

Livarot was liberated on 19 August. The division then faced a strong resistance by the 272nd Division of the German infantry, but also suffered losses to friendly fire from Allied aircraft. On 19 August, British artillery heavily bombed the area. The British arrived to seize a bridge, which hadn't been destroyed, across the river to Saint-Michel-de-Livet, north of Livarot. The French Resistance then learned that the Germans had abandoned Livarot and that the first British soldiers had entered the same day.

Heraldry

Politics and administration

The municipal council is composed of 23 members, including the mayor and six assistants.

Demographics
In 2012, the municipality had 2,183 inhabitants. Since 2004, censuses in municipalities of less than 10,000 inhabitants are held every five years (in 2008, 2013, 2018, etc. for Livarot) and legal municipal population are estimations in other years. Livarot counted 2,654 inhabitants in 1975.

Economy
Livarot cheese

Places and monuments
Former  (1841), included in the title of the historic monuments.
The Church of Saint-Ouen from the 15th century, and very reworked. The gallery of the 19th century organ is classified as an historic monument object.
The old Bisson cheesemakery (1902), converted into a Museum of the workshops of iron art.
The L'Isle Manor (1912), former property of the Bisson.
The Graindorge cheesmakery, burned in 1999 and rebuilt in 2001.
Vestiges of an ancient castle which was owned by Charles the Bad, King of Navarre.

Activity and events

Twinning
 South Molton, United Kingdom since 1975

Sports

The cycling section of the club has trained many riders such as father and son François and Romain Lemarchand, and also . Stage 7 of the 2015 Tour de France is also planned to start in Livarot.

Events
The Livarot Cheese Fair is held every year in August.

Personalities linked to the commune
Charles II of Navarre (1332-1387), King of Navarre and count of Évreux, owner of the old Castle.
 (1732 to Livarot - 1832), parish priest of Le Mesnil-Durand, Deputy of the clergy.
 (1802 Livarot - Livarot, 1894), politician.
 (born in 1946 in Livarot), Quebec radio host.
François Lemarchand (born in 1960 in Livarot), cyclist.

See also
Communes of the Calvados department

Notes

References

External links

 A few pictures of Livarot and its markets at the beginning of the 20th century.
 The Livarot Tourist Office website.

Former communes of Calvados (department)
Populated places disestablished in 2016